Events from the year 1533 in Ireland.

Incumbent
Lord: Henry VIII

Births
Gerald FitzGerald, 15th Earl of Desmond, Irish aristocrat and leader of the Desmond Rebellions of 1579 (d. 1583)

 
1530s in Ireland
Ireland
Years of the 16th century in Ireland